Hot Chocolates is a musical revue with music by Fats Waller and Harry Brooks and book by Andy Razaf. It was originally titled Tan Town Topics in hopes it would be picked up by Broadway. Performed at the Hudson Theater in New York City, it was directed by Leonard Harper and ran for 219 performances from June 20, 1929, to December 14, 1929. It is also referred to as Connie's Hot Chocolates. It was staged, directed and produced by Leonard Harper. While the revue featured music and singing, including the subsequent hit "Aint Misbehavin'," it was praised for the cast's dancing, including its male and female chorus lines.

Louis Armstrong made his Broadway debut as part of the show's pit band.  Cab Calloway later joined the cast as a replacement at Armstrong's recommendation. Calloway later adopted the song "(What Did I Do to Be So) Black and Blue," originally sung by Edith Wilson, for his performances decades later.

Cast
 Louis Armstrong Ensemble
 Jimmie Baskette Ensemble
 Paul Bass Ensemble
 Madeline Belt Ensemble
 Dick Campbell Ensemble
 Baby Cox Ensemble
 Eddie Green (comedy sketches) Ensemble
 Billy Higgins Ensemble
 Louise Higgins Ensemble
 Jubilee Singers Ensemble
 Billy Marey Ensemble
 Dolly McCormick Ensemble
 Paul Meers Ensemble
 Thelma Meers Ensemble
 Jazzlips Richardson Ensemble
 Margaret Simms Ensemble
 Three Midnight Steppers Ensemble
 Edith Wilson Ensemble
Cab Calloway Ensemble

See also 
 Ain't Misbehavin' (song)

References

External links 
 https://www.amazon.com/Rhythm-Sale-Grant-Harper-Reid/dp/0615678289
 http://www.rhythmforsale.com/
 
  (archive)

1929 musicals
Harlem Renaissance
Off-Broadway musicals
Revues